Kahekili I was a king of Maui. He was a noted warrior chief who nearly destroyed his country. He was styled Kahekilinui or "Kahekili the Great" even though his greatness was small in comparison to his descendant Kahekili II. His name was short for Kāne-Hekili after the Hawaiian god of thunder.

Biography 
Kahekili was a son of Kakae and High Chiefess Kapohauola and succeeded his uncle Kakaalaneo as the ruler of Maui. Kahekili was known to have impoverished his people by his many war campaigns. 

He married Haukanuimakamaka or Haukanimaka from Kauai. Kahekili was known to have had two children from her, a son named Kawaokaohele, whose name means "Our-Days-of-Poverty" to commemorate the impoverishment, and a beautiful daughter Keleanohoanaapiapi. He was succeeded by his son and his daughter married into the royal family of Oahu.

References

Royalty of Maui
Year of birth unknown
Year of death unknown